Cupid and Psyche is an oil on canvas painting by Anthony van Dyck. It is now in the Royal Collection and shown in Kensington Palace. 

One of the last works in van Dyck's oeuvre, it shows a marked influence of Titian and dates from his time as a court artist to Charles I of England. It is his sole surviving mythological painting from that period and possibly comes from a series of paintings on the Cupid and Psyche theme ordered for the Queen's House at Greenwich - other artists involved in the series included Jacob Jordaens and van Dyck's old tutor Peter Paul Rubens. That project was never completed, which is one possible explanation for why the painting has no frame and is relatively unfinished. This would date it to 1638–1640. A second alternative is that it was produced for the celebrations of Princess Mary's marriage to William II of Orange in 1641. Psyche may be based on van Dyck's mistress Margaret Lemon.

References

Sources
 Gian Pietro Bellori, Vite de' pittori, scultori e architecti moderni, Torino, Einaudi, 1976.
 Didier Bodart, Van Dyck, Prato, Giunti, 1997.
 Christopher Brown, Van Dyck 1599–1641, Milano, RCS Libri, 1999, .
 Justus Müller Hofstede, Van Dyck, Milano, Rizzoli/Skira, 2004.
 Stefano Zuffi, Il Barocco, Verona, Mondadori, 2004.

1640 paintings
Mythological paintings by Anthony van Dyck
Paintings of Cupid
Paintings in the Royal Collection of the United Kingdom
Cupid and Psyche
Works based on The Golden Ass